New Zealand has a large number of hot springs, known as waiariki in Māori. Many of them are used for therapeutic purposes.

The highest concentration of such springs is in the Central Plateau region of the North Island, in the Taupo Volcanic Zone. The area of Whakarewarewa near Rotorua is also known as Waiariki due to the abundance of geothermal features in the area.

Hot springs of New Zealand

This is an incomplete list and does not include the less notable or popular locations.

North Island
 Broadlands
 Frying Pan Lake now known as Waimangu Cauldron
 Hot Water Beach (Hahei)
 Katikati
 Kawerau
 Ketetahi Springs
 Mangatutu Hot Springs
 Matamata (Crystal Hot springs)
 Miranda
 Morere
 Mount Maunganui
 Mount Ruapehu
 Ngawha Springs
 Okoroire
 Paeroa
 Parakai, Helensville
 Rotorua
 Taupo (Spa Creek, De Bretts)
 Tauranga
 Te Aroha
 Te Puia Springs (Gisborne region)
 Te Puia Springs (Kawhia)
 Tokoroa
 Waihi Village, Tokaanu, and Motuoapa near Turangi
 Waingaro
 Wairakei
 Waiwera, near Orewa
 Whakatane (Awakeri springs)
 Whitianga (The Lost Spring)

South Island
 Hanmer Springs
 Hurunui River
 Maruia Springs, Maruia River
 Otehake River
 Wanganui River
 Welcome Flat, Copland River

See also
Geothermal areas in New Zealand

References

Further reading
 
 List of hot pools, temperatures, flow rates, etc. in Geothermal Resources In New Zealand An Overview: Trevor M. Hunt, Wairakei Research Centre, Institute of Geological & Nuclear Sciences Ltd 1998
 Geology of Naike hot springs, Waikato

External links

 The comprehensive guidebook 'Hot Springs of New Zealand' has been compiled by New Zealand's authority on recreational hot springs - hotspringsofnz.nz
 A list of 100 hot springs and hot pools in New Zealand - nzhotpools.co.nz